Uchuu may refer to:

Uchuu Keiji Gavan (Space Sheriff Gavan), the first of the Metal Heroes TV series broadcast 1982–1983
Uchuu Keiji Shaider (Space Sheriff Shaider), the third of the Metal Heroes series
Uchuu Keiji Sharivan (Space Sheriff Sharivan), the second of the Metal Heroes series
Uchuu no kishi Tekkaman Blade Space Knights, the second soundtrack album for the anime series, Tekkaman Blade
Uchuu Race: Astro Go! Go!, racing game for the Super Famicom system, exclusive to Japan
Uchuu simulations A large and realistic simulation of the Universe created using ATERUI II, the world's most powerful supercomputer dedicated to astronomy
Uchuu, Palau, a bar in Palau